Timothy Mahoney is an American politician and physician who is currently serving as the 35th Mayor of Fargo, North Dakota. Having been appointed deputy mayor by Mayor Dennis Walaker in 2006, Mahoney took the role of acting mayor on December 2, 2014, when Walaker died in office. He won a special election for the balance of Walaker's second term on April 28, 2015. He was unopposed for a full term on June 12, 2018. He is a member of the Democratic Party.

References

Living people
Year of birth missing (living people)
Mayors of Fargo, North Dakota
University of Notre Dame alumni
Tufts University School of Medicine alumni
Harvard School of Public Health alumni